Thubana abbreviata is a moth in the family Lecithoceridae. It was described by Kyu-Tek Park in 2003. It is found in Thailand.

References

Moths described in 2003
Thubana